Benjamin McLane Spock (May 2, 1903 – March 15, 1998) was an American pediatrician and left-wing political activist whose book Baby and Child Care (1946) is one of the best-selling books of the twentieth century, selling 500,000 copies in the six months after its initial publication in 1946 and 50 million by the time of Spock's death in 1998. The book's premise to mothers was that they "know more than you think you do." Spock's parenting advice and recommendations revolutionized parental upbringing in the United States, and he is considered to be amongst the most famous and influential Americans of the 20th century.

Spock was the first pediatrician to study psychoanalysis to try to understand children's needs and family dynamics. His ideas about childcare influenced several generations of parents to be more flexible and affectionate with their children and to treat them as individuals.  However, his theories were also widely criticized by colleagues for relying too heavily on anecdotal evidence rather than serious academic research. After undergoing a self-described "conversion to socialism", Spock became an activist in the New Left and anti-Vietnam War movements during the 1960s and early 1970s, culminating in his run for President of the United States as the People's Party nominee in 1972. He campaigned on a maximum wage, legalized abortion, and withdrawing troops from all foreign countries. At the time, his books were criticized by conservatives for propagating permissiveness and an expectation of instant gratification, a charge that Spock denied.

Spock also won an Olympic gold medal in rowing in 1924 while attending Yale University.

Biography

Early life and education 

Benjamin McLane Spock was born May 2, 1903, in New Haven, Connecticut; his parents were Benjamin Ives Spock, a Yale graduate and long-time general counsel of the New Haven Railroad, and Mildred Louise (Stoughton) Spock. His name came from Dutch ancestry; they originally spelled the name Spaak before migrating to the former colony of New Netherland. Spock was one of six children, including his younger sister environmentalist writer Marjorie Spock.

As did his father before him, Spock attended Phillips Andover Academy and Yale University. Prior to that he attended Hamden Hall Country Day School. Spock studied literature and history at Yale. Standing a lanky 6 feet and 4 inches, he also was active in college rowing. Eventually he became a part of the Olympic rowing crew (Men's Eights) that won a gold medal at the 1924 games in Paris. At Yale, he was inducted into the Eta chapter of the Zeta Psi fraternity and then into the senior society Scroll and Key. He attended the Yale School of Medicine for two years before shifting to Columbia University's College of Physicians and Surgeons, from which he graduated first in his class in 1929. By that time, he had married Jane Cheney.

Personal life 
Jane Cheney and Spock were married in 1927 and she assisted him in the research and writing of Dr. Spock's Baby & Child Care, which was published in 1946 by Duell, Sloan & Pearce as The Common Sense Book of Baby and Child Care. The book has sold more than 50 million copies in 42 languages.

Jane Cheney Spock was a civil liberties advocate and mother of two sons. She was born in Manchester, Connecticut, and attended Bryn Mawr College. She was active in Americans for Democratic Action, the American Civil Liberties Union and the National Committee for a Sane Nuclear Policy. Jane and Benjamin Spock divorced in 1976. Following their divorce, she organized and ran support groups for older divorced women.

In 1976, Spock and Mary Morgan were married. They built a home in Arkansas, on Beaver Lake, where Spock would row daily. Mary quickly adapted to Spock's life of travel and political activism.  She was arrested with him many times for civil disobedience. Once they were arrested in Washington, D.C. for praying on the White House lawn, along with other demonstrators. When arrested, Morgan was strip searched; Spock was not. She sued the jail and the mayor of Washington, D.C. for sex discrimination. The American Civil Liberties Union took the case, and won. Morgan also introduced Spock to massage, yoga, meditation and a macrobiotic diet, which reportedly improved his health. Mary scheduled his speaking dates and handled the legal agreements for Baby and Child Care for the 5th, 6th, 7th, 8th, and 9th editions. She continues to publish the book with the help of co-author Robert Needlman. Baby and Child Care still sells worldwide.

For most of his life, Spock wore Brooks Brothers suits and shirts with detachable collars, but at age 75, for the first time in his life, Mary Morgan got him to try blue jeans. She introduced him to Transactional analysis (TA) therapists, joined him in meditation twice a day, and cooked him a macrobiotic diet. "She gave me back my youth", Spock would tell reporters. He adapted to her lifestyle, as she did to his. There were 40 years difference in their ages, but Spock would tell reporters, when questioned about their age difference, that they were both 16.

For many years Spock lived aboard his sailboat, the Carapace, in the British Virgin Islands, off Tortola. At age 84, Spock won 3rd place in a rowing contest, crossing 4 miles (6.4 km) of the Sir Francis Drake Channel between Tortola and Norman Island in 2.5 hours. He credited his strength and good health to his life style and his love for life.

Spock had a second sailboat named Turtle, which he lived aboard and sailed in Maine in the summers. They lived only on boats, with no house, for most of 20 years. By 1991, he was unable to walk without assistance and was reported as infirm shortly before his death as well. At the very end of Spock's life, he was advised to come ashore by his physician, Steve Pauker, of New England Medical Center, Boston. In 1992, Spock received the Peace Abbey Courage of Conscience Award at the John F. Kennedy Presidential Library for his lifelong commitment to disarmament and peaceable child-rearing.

Spock died at a house he was renting in La Jolla, California, on March 15, 1998. His ashes are buried in Rockport, Maine, where he spent his summers.

Books
In 1946, Spock published his book The Common Sense Book of Baby and Child Care, which became a bestseller. Its message to parents is that "you know more than you think you do." By 1998 it had sold more than 50 million copies, and had been translated into 42 languages.

According to the New York Times, Baby and Child Care was, throughout its first 52 years, the second-best-selling book, next to the Bible. According to other sources, it was among best-sellers, albeit not second-best-selling.

Spock advocated ideas about parenting that were, at the time, considered out of the mainstream. Over time, his books helped to bring about major change. Previously, experts had told parents that babies needed to learn to sleep on a regular schedule, and that picking them up and holding them whenever they cried would only teach them to cry more and not to sleep through the night (a notion that borrows from behaviorism). They were told to feed their children on a regular schedule, and that they should not pick them up, kiss them, or hug them, because that would not prepare them to be strong and independent individuals in a harsh world. In contrast, Spock encouraged parents to show affection for their children and to see them as individuals.

By the late 1960s however, Spock's opposition to the Vietnam War had damaged his reputation; the 1968 edition of Baby and Child Care sold half as many copies of the prior edition. Later in life Spock wrote a book entitled Dr. Spock on Vietnam and co-wrote an autobiography entitled Spock on Spock (with Mary Morgan Spock), in which he stated his attitude toward aging: Delay and Deny.

In the seventh edition of Baby and Child Care, published a few weeks after he died, Spock advocated for a bold change in children's diets, recommending that all children switch to a vegan diet after the age of 2. Spock himself had switched to an all-plant diet in 1991, after a series of illnesses that left him weak and unable to walk unaided. After making the dietary change, he lost 50 pounds, regained his ability to walk and became healthier overall. The revised edition stated children on an all-plant diet will reduce their risk of developing heart disease, obesity, high blood pressure, diabetes and certain diet-related cancers. Studies suggest that vegetarian children are leaner, and adult vegetarians are known to be at lower risk of such diseases. However, Spock's recommendations were criticized as being irresponsible towards children's health and children's ability to sustain normal growth, which have been aided with minerals such as calcium, riboflavin, vitamin D, iron, zinc and at times protein.

Spock's approach to childhood nutrition was criticized by a number of experts, including his co-author, Boston pediatrician Dr. Steven J. Parker, as too extreme and likely to result in nutritional deficiencies unless it is very carefully planned and executed, something that would be difficult for working parents. Dr. T. Berry Brazelton, a pediatrician at Boston City Hospital who specialized in child behavior and who was also a longtime admirer and friend of Dr. Spock, called the new dietary recommendations "absolutely insane." Dr. Neal Barnard, president of Physicians for Responsible Medicine, an organization in Washington that advocates strict vegetarian diets for everyone, acknowledged that he had drafted the section on nutrition in the Spock's 1998  edition of Baby and Child Care, but that Dr. Spock had edited it to give it "his personal touch." It was acknowledged that in his final years, Spock had strokes, bouts with pneumonia and also a heart attack.

Views

Sudden infant death syndrome
Spock advocated that infants should not be placed on their back when sleeping, commenting in his 1958 edition that "if [an infant] vomits, he's more likely to choke on the vomitus." This advice was extremely influential on health-care providers, with nearly unanimous support through to the 1990s. Later empirical studies, however, found that there is a significantly increased risk of sudden infant death syndrome (SIDS) associated with infants sleeping on their abdomens. Advocates of evidence-based medicine have used this as an example of the importance of basing health-care recommendations on statistical evidence, with one researcher estimating that as many as 50,000 infant deaths in Europe, Australia, and the US could have been prevented had this advice been altered by 1970, when such evidence became available.

Male circumcision
In the 1940s, Spock favored circumcision of males performed within a few days of birth. However, in the 1976 revision of Baby and Child Care he concurred with a 1971 American Academy of Pediatrics task force that there was no medical reason to recommend routine circumcision, and in a 1989 article for Redbook magazine he stated that "circumcision of males is traumatic, painful, and of questionable value." He received the first Human Rights Award from the International Symposium on Circumcision (ISC) in 1991 and was quoted saying, "My own preference, if I had the good fortune to have another son, would be to leave his little penis alone".

Social and political activism
In 1962, Spock joined The Committee for a Sane Nuclear Policy, otherwise known as SANE. Spock was politically outspoken and active in the movement to end the Vietnam War. In 1968, he and four others (including William Sloane Coffin, Marcus Raskin, Mitchell Goodman, and Michael Ferber) were singled out for prosecution by then Attorney General Ramsey Clark on charges of conspiracy to counsel, aid, and abet resistance to the draft. Spock and three of his alleged co-conspirators were convicted, although the five had never been in the same room together. His two-year prison sentence was never served; the case was appealed and in 1969 a federal court set aside his conviction.

In 1967, Spock was pressed to run as Martin Luther King Jr.'s vice-presidential running mate at the National Conference for New Politics over Labor Day weekend in Chicago.

In 1968, Spock signed the "Writers and Editors War Tax Protest" pledge, vowing to refuse tax payments in protest against the Vietnam War, and he later became a sponsor of the War Tax Resistance project, which practiced and advocated tax resistance as a form of anti-war protest. He was also arrested for his involvement in anti-war protests resulting from his signing of the anti-war manifesto "A Call to Resist Illegitimate Authority" circulated by members of the radical intellectual collective RESIST. The individuals arrested during this incident came to be known as the Boston Five.

In 1968, the American Humanist Association named Spock Humanist of the Year. On 15 October 1969, Spock was a featured speaker at the Moratorium to End the War in Vietnam march.

In 1970, Dr. Benjamin Spock was active in The New Party serving as Honorary co-chairman with Gore Vidal. In the 1972 United States presidential election, Spock was the People's Party candidate with a platform that called for free medical care; the repeal of "victimless crime" laws, including the legalization of abortion, homosexuality, and cannabis; a guaranteed minimum income for families; and for an end to American military interventionism and the immediate withdrawal of all American troops from foreign countries. In the 1970s and 1980s, Spock demonstrated and gave lectures against nuclear weapons and cuts in social welfare programs.

In 1972, Spock, Julius Hobson (his Vice Presidential candidate), Linda Jenness (Socialist Workers Party Presidential candidate), and Socialist Workers Party Vice Presidential candidate Andrew Pulley wrote to Major General Bert A. David, commanding officer of Fort Dix, asking for permission to distribute campaign literature and to hold an election-related campaign meeting. On the basis of Fort Dix regulations 210-26 and 210–27, General David refused the request. Spock, Hobson, Jenness, Pulley, and others then filed a case that ultimately made its way to the United States Supreme Court (424 U.S. 828—Greer, Commander, Fort Dix Military Reservation, et al., v. Spock et al.), which ruled against the plaintiffs.

Spock was the People's Party and the Peace and Freedom Party nominee in 1976 for vice president as the running mate of Margaret Wright.

Conservative backlash
Norman Vincent Peale was a popular preacher who supported the Vietnam War. During the late 1960s, Peale criticized the anti-Vietnam War movement and the perceived laxity of that era, placing the blame on Dr. Spock's books: "The U.S. was paying the price of two generations that followed the Dr. Spock baby plan of instant gratification of needs."

In the 1960s and 1970s, blame was placed on Spock for the disorderliness of young people, many of whose parents had been devotees of Baby and Child Care. Vice President Spiro Agnew also blamed Spock for "permissiveness". These allegations were enthusiastically embraced by conservative adults, who viewed the rebellious youth of that era with disapproval, referring to them as "the Spock generation".

Spock's supporters countered that these criticisms betrayed an ignorance of what Spock had actually written, and/or a political bias against Spock's left-wing political activities. Spock himself, in his autobiography, pointed out that he had never advocated permissiveness; also, that the attacks and claims that he had ruined American youth only arose after his public opposition to the Vietnam war. He regarded these claims as ad hominem attacks, whose political motivation and nature were clear.

Spock addressed these accusations in the first chapter of his 1994 book, Rebuilding American Family Values: A Better World for Our Children.

In June 1992, Spock told Associated Press journalist David Beard, there was a link between pediatrics and political activism: 

Conservatives also criticize Spock for being interested in the ideas of Sigmund Freud and John Dewey and his efforts to integrate their philosophies into the general population. Spock wrote:

Family
Spock had two children: Michael and John. Michael was formerly the director of the Boston Children's Museum and since retired from the museum profession; John is the owner of a construction firm. Spock's grandson Peter, Michael's son, died by suicide on Christmas of 1983 at the age of 22 by jumping from the roof of the Children's Museum. He had been employed at the museum part-time and had long been diagnosed with the disease schizophrenia. This story has often been misreported as Michael's, not Peter's suicide.

Olympic success
In 1924, while at Yale, Spock was part of the all-Yale Men's eight rowing team at the Paris Olympics, captained by James Rockefeller, later president of what would become Citigroup. Competing on the Seine, they won the gold medal.

Books by Benjamin Spock
Baby and Child Care (1946, with revisions up to tenth edition, 2018)
A Baby's First Year (1954)
Feeding Your Baby and Child (1955)
Dr. Spock Talks With Mothers (1961)
Problems of Parents (1962)
Caring for Your Disabled Child (1965)
Dr. Spock on Vietnam (1968)
Decent and Indecent (1970)
A Teenager's Guide to Life and Love (1970)
Raising Children in a Difficult Time (1974)
Spock on Parenting (1988)
Spock on Spock: a Memoir of Growing Up With the Century (1989)
A Better World for Our Children (1994)
Dr. Spock's the School Years: The Emotional and Social Development of Children 01 Edition (2001)

See also

List of peace activists
Fred Rogers (Mister Rogers)

References

Further reading
Bloom, Lynn Z. Doctor Spock: Biography of a Conservative Radical. The Bobbs-Merrill Company, Indianapolis: 1972.
Maier, Thomas. Doctor Spock: An American Life. Harcourt Brace, New York: 1998.
Interview in The Libertarian Forum 4, no. 12 (December 1972; mislabelled no. 10).  The Libertarian Forum is largely favorable to Spock's views as being pro-libertarian.

External links

Benjamin Spock Papers at Syracuse University
Photos of the 1st edition of The Common Sense Book of Baby and Child Care
Details surrounding the 1968 case
Photographic portrait taken in old age

Audio: Benjamin Spock speech at UC Berkeley Vietnam Teach-In, 1965 (in RealAudio and via UC Berkeley Media Resources Center)

1903 births
1998 deaths
20th-century American male writers
20th-century American physicians
20th-century American politicians
Candidates in the 1972 United States presidential election
1976 United States vice-presidential candidates
American anti–nuclear weapons activists
American anti–Vietnam War activists
American family and parenting writers
American humanists
American male non-fiction writers
American male rowers
20th-century American memoirists
United States Navy personnel of World War II
American pediatricians
American people of Dutch descent
American tax resisters
Analysands of Sándor Radó
Columbia University Vagelos College of Physicians and Surgeons alumni
Medalists at the 1924 Summer Olympics
Military personnel from New Haven, Connecticut
New Left
Non-interventionism
Olympic gold medalists for the United States in rowing
People's Party (United States, 1971) politicians
Phillips Academy alumni
Physicians from New Haven, Connecticut
Politicians from New Haven, Connecticut
Rowers at the 1924 Summer Olympics
United States Navy officers
University of Pittsburgh faculty
Writers from New Haven, Connecticut
Yale College alumni
Hamden Hall Country Day School alumni